Ajaikapada Bhairava Temple is dedicated to Ekapada Bhairava - an aspect of Shiva -  present in Jagatsinghpur district of Odisha, India.

Historical evidence
The archaeological survey has established that the temple was built during the early 10th century by the Somavamsi Keshari Kings of Orissa. Later it was destroyed due to flood and attacks by non-Hindu rulers. The present temple was rebuilt during the 20th century.

Architecture
The current temple is a small Pidha deula reconstructed during the early 20th century but the Garbhagriha houses the image of Bhairava and a Shivalinga. The bhairava has one feet and four hands, of which the lower two are broken. The upper two  hold disc-shaped structures. The Ajaikapada Bhairava is the ruling deity of the star Pūrva Bhādrapadā. It is evident that someone who was expert in astrology and tantra established this temple.

Location
The temple is located 6 km from Alanahat, Sathalapada, in Jagatsinghpur, near River Alaka (a branch of Mahanadi). Direct transport is available from Nuagaon, too.

See also
Vaital Deula
Bhairava

References
description of archaeological evidence ekapada bhairava

Hindu temples in Jagatsinghpur district